Charges of Indictment is the seventh studio album by American rap group The Dayton Family from Flint, Michigan. It was released on June 21, 2011 via Hatchet House/Psychopathic Records, making it the group's first full-length release on the label, and their second album since 1994's What's on My Mind? to feature the three original core members, Bootleg, Shoestring and Backstabber, following 2009's The Return: The Right to Remain Silent. The album features guest appearances from Dink Sosa, Flex of Top Authority, Gucci Mane, Insane Clown Posse, Philly Cocaine and Twiztid.

The lyrical themes of the album derive from horrorcore and gangsta rap, focusing on subject matter which includes murder, crime and drug use.

Reaching a peak position of number 75 on the US Billboard Top R&B/Hip-Hop Albums, the album remained on the chart for a week.

Reception

David Jeffries of AllMusic gave the album 3.5 out of 5 stars, writing "Charges of Indictment is a Dayton Family album in the classic Flint style, although only their loyal, proudly lecherous following would think of it as such". Spin ranked Charges of Indictment as the 25th best rap album of 2011.

Track listing

Chart history

References

External links

Charges of Indictment by The Dayton Family on iTunes

2011 albums
The Dayton Family albums
Hatchet House albums
Psychopathic Records albums